Martin J. Knorr (January 31, 1906 – October 7, 1989) was an American lawyer and politician from New York.

Life
He was born on January 31, 1906, in Williamsburg, Brooklyn, New York City. He graduated from Dartmouth College and Brooklyn Law School. He practiced law, and lived in Ridgewood, Queens.

Knorr was a member of the New York State Assembly (Queens Co., 3rd D.) in 1953 and 1954.

He was a member of the New York State Senate (15th D.) in 1966. In November 1966, after re-apportionment, he ran in the 12th District for re-election, but was defeated by Democrat William C. Brennan.

Knorr was again a member of the State Senate from 1969 to 1988, sitting in the 178th, 179th, 180th, 181st, 182nd, 183rd, 184th, 185th, 186th and 187th New York State Legislatures. In January 1985, he became Assistant Majority Whip.

He died on October 7, 1989, at the home of one of his daughters in Long Beach, New York.

Sources

1906 births
1989 deaths
People from Queens, New York
Republican Party members of the New York State Assembly
Dartmouth College alumni
Brooklyn Law School alumni
Republican Party New York (state) state senators
20th-century American politicians